The Special is a free city life news magazine in Toronto, Ontario, Canada, published by Midnight Media, that focuses on Canadian celebrity, politics, products and ideas, fashion and trends. It was first published in 2002.

Known for its old-school tabloid irreverence and in-your-face reporting style, the publication operates under the motto of "No Fear, No Favour". Strategic targets that the Special sets its sights on include the corporate establishment, big brother government and miscarriages of justice.

The magazine runs regular investigative features such as "School Time Confidential", trend stories in Fad Forecast and the award-winning photocomic Screwed. The Special houses famed Toronto celebrity columnist Clammy J. Byner, ex-Navy SEAL Izzy Stern, Mentalist Mysterion the Mind Reader, Cam Gordon's Off the Radar and sexpert Polly Roxxhoff. Magazine segments are regularly featured on SpecialFM in Toronto. The segments were originally hosted by DJs Mad Dug and Anthony Anderson until they were fired due to a morning radio prank gone wrong involving pizzas, George Wendt and the Canadian Radio-television and Telecommunications Commission.

External links
The Special Issue 21
SpecialFM Podcast
Toronto Tabloid Looking To Go National

Newspapers published in Toronto
Publications established in 2002
2002 establishments in Ontario